Slain! is a platform game developed by Wolf Brew Games and published by Digerati Distribution. The game shares similarities in tone and design to the Castlevania series, with elements of medieval Gothic architecture and heavy metal. The game was received negatively at launch and was overhauled and relaunched as Slain: Back from Hell. The updated version received higher review scores.

Gameplay

Development
Slain! was developed by Wolf Brew Games. The game was initially scheduled to be released in late 2015, but was delayed to 24 March 2016. Due to the negative reception of Slain!, the game was overhauled and relaunched as Slain: Back from Hell on 2 August 2016. It was released on the Nintendo Switch, in North America and Europe on December 7, 2017, and in Japan on March 1, 2018.

Reception

Slain! received "mixed or average" and "generally unfavorable" reviews, depending on a platform, according to review aggregator Metacritic.

References

External links
 

2016 video games
Linux games
MacOS games
Nintendo Switch games
PlayStation 4 games
PlayStation Vita games
PlayStation Network games
Video games developed in the United States
Windows games
Xbox One games